The 2013 Swiss executive pay initiative of 2013 was a successful federal popular initiative in Switzerland to control executive pay of companies listed on the stock market, and to increase shareholders' say in corporate governance. It was one of three questions put to the electorate in the March 2013 referendums. The vote took place on the 3 March 2013, and passed with a majority of 67.9%, with a 46% turnout. The initiative mandates the Federal Government to implement the provisions within one year, pending implementation of the final law.

The initiative partly reflected developments in the United States Dodd-Frank Wall Street Reform Act 2010 §957, that banned brokers from voting on their clients' money, and the Stewardship Code 2010 in the United Kingdom, which placed a duty on financial intermediaries to disclose their voting policies and make use of voting power. It also reflected a long running debate in Germany, which had not yet been reformed, about the position of banks.

Background
Given the a number of corporate scandals, leading up to the global financial crisis beginning in 2007 a medium-size businessman and politician named Thomas Minder launched a campaign "against rip-off salaries". By 26 February 2008, he had gathered 118,583 signatures to launch a referendum under the Swiss constitutional rules. Minder's concern focused on
 the excesses of executive pay
 the ability of banks, who in the Swiss (and German) system of shareholding hold all share certificates, to vote by proxy using shares owned by other people, and
 the inability of pension beneficiaries and policyholders to determine their deposits were being used for voting.

Supporters of the initiative spent 200,000 Swiss franc, whilst opponents spent 8 million Swiss francs in their campaign to block the reform. The public campaign drew particular attention to the large payouts for executives of Novartis and major Swiss banks. On 3 March, the referendum results showed that 67.9 per cent of voters supported the reforms.

A German initiative followed a month later, and if passed would represent a significant broadening of pay controls in Europe.

Text of the initiative
The translation of the text is as follows.

Results

Significance
The Swiss referendum had an immediate impact on other countries seeking its own reforms. It led to calls by the German Social Democratic Party to introduce similar reforms in Germany and it is quoted in the Bill proposed in Italy on cap-salaries for public employees.

Daniel Alpert of The Century Foundation saw the measures as unnecessary.

See also
Say on pay

Notes

External links

Official initiative committee "against rip-off salaries" 
Abzockerei Referendum page on Swiss government website 
Text of initiative on Swiss government website 
Background information on the initiative in the Swissvotes database

executive pay initiative
executive pay initiative
executive pay initiative
Executive compensation